The 2017 Monte Carlo Rally (formally known as the 85ème Rallye Automobile Monte-Carlo) is a motor racing event for rally cars that was held over four days between 19 and 22 January 2017. It marks the eighty-fifth running of the Monte Carlo Rally, and is the first round of the 2017 World Rally Championship, WRC-2 and WRC-3 seasons.

The rally will be the first round in which 2017-specification World Rally Cars compete, and will see the return of Toyota and Citroën to the championship, with the Toyota Yaris WRC and Citroën C3 WRC respectively.

Report
Hayden Paddon withdrew from the rally after a fatal accident involving a spectator on the opening stage. Paddon lost control after hitting a patch of black ice, which spun him into an embankment and rolled the car. The spectator was hit after Paddon initially lost control. The stage was stopped while medical attention was sought and the car retrieved, but the spectator could not be revived. Although Paddon was eligible to re-enter the rally under Rally-2 regulations, the team chose to withdraw his car from the event.

Entry list

Classification

Event standings

Special stages

Power Stage 
The Power Stage was a 21.36 km (13.48 mi) stage at the end of the rally.

Championship standings after the rally

Drivers' Championship standings

Manufacturers' Championship standings

References

External links
 
 The official website of the World Rally Championship

2017
2017 World Rally Championship season
2017 in French motorsport
2017 in Monégasque sport
January 2017 sports events in Europe